Tiaret is a province (wilaya) of Algeria. The capital is Tiaret.

History
The province was created from El Asnam department and Tiaret department in 1974.

In 1984 Tissemsilt Province was carved out of its territory.

Administrative division
The province is divided into 14 districts (daïras), which are further divided into 42 communes or municipalities.

Districts

 Aïn Deheb
 Aïn Kermes
 Dahmouni
 Frenda
 Hamadia
 Ksar Chellala
 Mahdia
 Mechraâ Sfa
 Medroussa
 Meghila
 Oued Lili
 Rahouia
 Sogueur
 Tiaret

Communes

 Aïn Bouchekif
 Aïn Deheb
 Aïn El Hadid
 Aïn Kermes
 Aïn Zarit
 Bougara
 Chehaima
 Dahmouni
 Djebilet Rosfa
 Djillali Ben Omar
 Faidja
 Frenda
 Guertoufa
 Hamadia
 Ksar Chellala
 Madna
 Mahdia
 Mechraa Safa
 Medrissa
 Medroussa
 Meghila
 Mellakou
 Nadorah
 Naima
 Oued Lilli
 Rahouia
 Rechaiga
 Sebaine
 Sebt
 Serghine
 Si Abdelghani
 Sidi Abderrahmane
 Sidi Ali Mellal
 Sidi Bakhti
 Sidi Hosni
 Sougueur
 Tagdemt
 Takhemaret
 Tiaret
 Tidda
 Tousnina
 Zmalet El Emir Abdelkader

References

External links
 Official website

 
Provinces of Algeria
States and territories established in 1974